Haret may refer to:

a village within the administration of Mărășești town in Romania
Spiru Haret, a Romanian mathematician, astronomer, and politician
a crater on the Moon
Spiru Haret University in Bucharest, Romania
Haret Al Fawar, village in Zgharta District, Lebanon
Haret Hreik, district in Beirut, Lebanon
Haret Elroum and Haret Zuweila, districts of Cairo, Egypt